() and  are country subdivisions in Italy and several Hispanophone and Lusophone nations, respectively. They are often translated as "municipality". In the English language, a municipality often is defined as relating to a single city or town; however, in Spanish, the term "municipio" may not mean a single city or town, but rather a jurisdiction housing several towns and cities, like a township, county, borough or civil parish. The Italian term "municipalità" refers either to a single city or a group of cities and towns in a township, but Portuguese usage of the term is almost entirely restricted to a cluster of cities or towns like in a county, township and so forth. However, in Brazil, a Municipio is an independent city & a public corporporation with status of Federated Entity.

Overview

See also 
 Municipalidad
 Commune (country subdivision)

Notes

References

Types of administrative division
Spanish words and phrases
Portuguese words and phrases
Italian words and phrases